Sweetwater is a census-designated place (CDP) in northern Nez Perce County, Idaho, United States. Its population was 143 as of the 2010 census.

Description

Demographics

See also

 List of census-designated places in Idaho

References

External links

Census-designated places in Nez Perce County, Idaho
Census-designated places in Idaho